Luther Johnson (born Lucious Brinson, August 30, 1934 or 1941 – March 18, 1976), sometimes credited with the sobriquets "Georgia Boy", "Snake", or "Snake Boy", was an American Chicago blues and electric blues guitarist, singer and songwriter.

AllMusic journalist Ron Wynn stated, "Johnson's own inimitable vocals, raspy lines and tart guitar eventually create his own aura...  a good, occasionally outstanding blues artist."  He is not to be confused with Luther "Guitar Junior" Johnson, nor Luther "Houserocker" Johnson, from Atlanta, Georgia.

Life and career
He was born in Davisboro, Georgia. Sources give different years of birth, ranging from 1934 to 1941 (according to his headstone), though 1939 has also been published.   He was raised on a farm and taught himself to play guitar.

After completing his service in the US Army, Johnson played guitar with the Milwaukee Supreme Angels, a local gospel group in Milwaukee, Wisconsin. However, he gravitated towards blues and formed his own trio in Milwaukee. He relocated to Chicago, Illinois, in the early 1960s. He backed Elmore James prior to his James's death in 1963, and joined Muddy Waters' backing band in 1966. Johnson worked with various musicians during this period, including Chicago Bob Nelson. He recorded his debut album, Come On Home, in 1968, with Muddy Waters' band.

In 1970, Johnson moved to Boston, Massachusetts, and found work on the blues festival and college circuits for the next few years. His album Born in Georgia was released by Black & Blue Records. It was followed by Chicken Shack (1974), Lonesome in My Bedroom (1975), and the final album issued in his lifetime, Get Down to the Nitty Gritty (1976).  On records issued in his lifetime, he was credited as either Luther Johnson or Luther "Georgia Boy" Johnson, though he was also known to contemporaries as Luther "Snake" Johnson.

Johnson died of cancer in Boston on March 18, 1976. He was interred at the Mount Hope Cemetery, in Mattapan, Massachusetts.

Discography

See also
List of Chicago blues musicians
List of electric blues musicians

References

External links
Biography and detailed discography

Oldies.com
Mini biography at Last.fm

1941 births
1976 deaths
American blues singers
American blues guitarists
American male guitarists
Chicago blues musicians
Electric blues musicians
Singers from Georgia (U.S. state)
Songwriters from Georgia (U.S. state)
People from Washington County, Georgia
Deaths from cancer in Massachusetts
20th-century American singers
20th-century American guitarists
Songwriters from Illinois
Guitarists from Georgia (U.S. state)
Guitarists from Illinois
20th-century American male singers
Black & Blue Records artists
American male songwriters